Rosemont, also known as Joseph W. and Ida Guest House, is a historic home located at 15 Cragmere Road, Wilmington, New Castle County, Delaware.   It was built about 1893, and is a -story, three-bay, T-shaped vernacular brick-and-frame farmhouse. It consists of a gambrel-roofed main block with projecting central bay, with a gable-roofed rear wing.  The house has elements of Stick, Queen Anne, and Colonial Revival-style detailing.  Also on the property is a -story frame carriage house.

It was listed on the National Register of Historic Places in March 2009.  The property was the Highlighted Property of the Week when the National Park Service released its weekly list of March 6, 2009.

References

Houses on the National Register of Historic Places in Delaware
Houses completed in 1893
Colonial Revival architecture in Delaware
Houses in New Castle County, Delaware
Houses in Wilmington, Delaware
National Register of Historic Places in Wilmington, Delaware